Arthur Babcock Champlin (February 7, 1858 – January 8, 1946) was a Massachusetts journalist and politician who served in both branches of the Massachusetts legislature, as a city councilor, and as the Mayor of Chelsea, Massachusetts.

Newspaper career

Champlin started out his career in journalism when he became a district reported for The Boston Globe at the age of 16.  When The Chelsea Record was started two years later Champlin became one of its managers while still a teenager.  In 1886 Champlin became the founder and publisher of The Chelsea Gazette.

References

External links
 Mayors of Chelsea 1857 – 1991.

1858 births
19th-century American newspaper publishers (people)
American male journalists
Massachusetts city council members
Members of the Massachusetts House of Representatives
Massachusetts state senators
Mayors of Chelsea, Massachusetts
The Boston Globe people
1946 deaths
Writers from Chelsea, Massachusetts